Odis Leonard Echols, Jr. (May 28, 1930 – March 28, 2013) was an American politician, songwriter, radio broadcaster, and lobbyist.

Born in Clovis, New Mexico, Echols graduated from Texas Tech University, Echols and his father were radio broadcasters. Echols served in the New Mexico State Senate 1966–77. He died in Albuquerque, New Mexico.

Notes

Archival Materials

 Echols Family Papers, 1890-2007, at Southwest Collection/Special Collections Library, Texas Tech University

1930 births
2013 deaths
People from Clovis, New Mexico
Texas Tech University alumni
New Mexico state senators
Deaths from dementia in New Mexico